Shady Grove School may refer to:

in the United States
(by state)
Shady Grove School (Pea Ridge, Arkansas), listed on the NRHP in Arkansas
Shady Grove School and Community Building, DeRidder, LA, listed on the NRHP in Louisiana
Shady Grove School in Whittemore, Michigan
Shady Grove School (Louisa County, Virginia), listed on the NRHP in Virginia